Manan Sharma (born 19 March 1991) is a former Indian cricketer who played for Delhi cricket team in domestic cricket. He is an all-rounder who bats left-handed, and bowls slow left-arm orthodox. He played for India Under-19 cricket team at the 2010 ICC Under-19 Cricket World Cup. He is the son of former India international cricketer Ajay Sharma. 

In October 2017, he scored his maiden century in first-class cricket, batting for Delhi against Railways in the 2017–18 Ranji Trophy.

On 20 August 2021 he announced his retirement from playing cricket in India.

References

External links
 

Indian cricketers
Living people
1991 births
Abahani Limited cricketers
Delhi cricketers